Ram Chandra of Shahjahanpur (1899-1983), also known as Babuji, was a yogi from Uttar Pradesh in northern India. He spent most of his life developing a method of Raja Yoga meditation called Sahaj Marg. He founded an organization called Shri Ram Chandra Mission in 1945, dedicated and named after his teacher, who was also called Ram Chandra.

Early life 
Ram Chandra was born on 30 April 1899 in Shahjahanpur, Uttar Pradesh, India. His family was well off: his father Rai Bahadur Shri Badri Prasad held the position of Honorary Special Magistrate 1st Class. He left school after his matriculation, and worked in the local court for thirty-one years as a record keeper. In June 1922, at the age of twenty-three, he met the spiritual teacher Ram Chandra, who lived in Fatehgarh.

Spiritual life 
He learnt the Raja Yoga meditation practice from Ram Chandra of Fatehgarh. He developed the method with the intention of making it more applicable in the contemporary world. He founded and registered a non-profit organization called Shri Ram Chandra Mission in 1945 to teach this new method, which he called Sahaj Marg (a name which was subsequently changed to "heartfulness meditation"), and he wrote a number of books about it.

Bibliography
 Reality at Dawn (1954) 
 Efficacy of Raja Yoga in the Light of Sahaj Marg 
 Commentary on the Ten Maxims of Sahaj Marg (1946) 
 Towards Infinity (1957) 
 Sahaj Marg Philosophy (1978) 
 Voice Real - The First Selection (1970)
 Voice Real - The Second Selection
 Autobiography of Ram Chandra (Volume 1 and 2) (1974)

References 

Indian spiritual teachers
Indian spiritual writers
Indian yoga teachers
1899 births
1983 deaths